Winds is a Norwegian neoclassical/progressive metal band formed in 1998. The music is largely influenced by classical music, with Andy Winter's piano work and Carl August Tidemann's guitar solos, often the central focuses. The lyrics are written by Winter, and deal mostly with astral and existentialist philosophy.

Members

Current members
 Lars Eric Si  Eikind (Age of Silence, Before the Dawn, Khold, Tulus) - vocals, bass
 Carl August Tidemann (Arcturus, Tritonus) - guitars
 Jan Axel von Blomberg a.k.a. Hellhammer (Age of Silence, Arcturus, The Kovenant, Mayhem, Dimmu Borgir)  - drums
 Andy Winter (Age of Silence, Sculptured, Subterranean Masquerade) - piano

Session members

Of Entity and Mind
Drajevolitch - vocals
Paul S - Bass, fretless bass
K. Haugen - electric and acoustic guitars (Age of Silence)

Reflections of the I
Drajevolitch - vocals
Vegard Johnsen - violin
Stig Ove Ore - viola
Hans Josef Groh - cello

The Imaginary Direction of Time
Andre Orvik - violin
Vegard Johnsen - violin
Dorthe Dreier - viola
Hans Josef Groh - cello

Prominence and Demise
Lars Nedland (Solefald, Age of Silence, Borknagar, Ásmegin) - guest appearance, vocals
Dan Swanö (Nightingale, Edge of Sanity, Bloodbath) - guest appearance, vocals
Oystein Moe (Tritonus) - guest appearance, bass
Agnete M. Kirkevaag (Madder Mortem) - guest appearance, vocals
Andre Orvik - violin
Vegard Johnsen - violin
Dorthe Dreier - viola
Hans Josef Groh - cello

Discography

Note 
  - the "history" is the official biography from the official Winds website: http://www.winds.ws/

External links 
 Official Website
 Official The End Records Winds page
 Carl August Tidemann Official Site

Norwegian progressive metal musical groups
Musical groups established in 1998
1998 establishments in Norway
Musical groups from Norway with local place of origin missing